Remseck am Neckar is a town in the district of Ludwigsburg, Baden-Württemberg, Germany. It is situated at the confluence of the rivers Rems and Neckar, about 12 km northeast of Stuttgart, and 7 km southeast of Ludwigsburg. 
The town was formed on January 1, 1975, initially under the name Aldingen am Neckar. In 1977, it received the name Remseck am Neckar and has had the status of a Große Kreisstadt since January 1, 2004.

History
Five of the six boroughs of Remseck used to be villages and were founded several hundred years ago. References to Aldingen and Hochdorf can be found as early as 1100, Hochberg is mentioned in a text from 1231 whereas Neckargröningen is already referred to in 806. Neckarrems is also mentioned in 1268 as „Rems“; the „Neckar“ was added only in the 17th century.

Hochdorf, Hochberg, and Neckarrems used to belong to Waiblingen, whereas Aldingen und Neckargröningen belonged to Ludwigsburg. In 1938 however, all five boroughs were assigned to Ludwigsburg.

Today’s Remseck am Neckar was founded on January 1, 1975, by amalgamation of the communities Aldingen, Hochberg, Hochdorf, Neckargröningen und Neckarrems and was initially named “Gemeinde Aldingen am Neckar”, but renamed on July 1, 1977. The town’s new name “Remseck” was chosen due to a castle, which used to be located on a mountain at the confluence of the rivers Rems and Neckar. The “Castle Remseck” was built in 1842 at exactly the same place, further verifying the name “Remseck”.

In 1992, Pattonville, a former residential area which was founded in 1955 and was predominantly inhabited by US Americans, joined Remseck, but was split in two parts: The eastern part belongs to Remseck, the western part belongs to Kornwestheim.

In 1999, the population exceeded 20,000, which is the minimal limit of inhabitants a town has to have to become a city. The town government applied for town privileges in 2003 and obtained city rights on January 1, 2004.

Government

District Council
Since the last local elections (June 7, 2009), Remseck’s local council has a total of 26 members. 6 members are from the CDU (23,8% in the election), 5 members from the Freie Wähler (20,9%), 5 members from the FDP (18,7%), 5 members from the Die Grünen (18,6%) and 5 members from the SPD (17,9%).

Mayor
Until 2004, the chairman of the district council was called mayor. When Remseck became a city, the mayor became the “Oberbürgermeister” (head mayor). The Oberbürgermeister is elected directly by the people for eight years and he has two proxies, the “Erster Bürgermeister” (first mayor) and the “Bürgermeister” (mayor).

 Oberbürgermeister: Dirk Schönberger (since 2014)
 Oberbürgermeister: Karl-Heinz Schlumberger (since 1998)
 Erster Bürgermeister: Karl-Heinz Balzer (since 1992)
 Bürgermeister: Reinhard Melchior (since 1996)

Infrastructure and Media
Remseck has six boroughs: 
 Aldingen (Aldingen am Neckar and the farmstead Sonnenhof)
 Hochberg (Hochberg and Egenhöft)
 Hochdorf (Hochdorf)
 Neckargröningen (Neckargröningen)
 Neckarrems (Neckarrems, the farmstead Remseck and Reningen)
 Pattonville (Eastern part of the settlement Pattonville)

Public Transportation

Rail
Since 1999, Remseck is connected to Stuttgart via line U14 (Remseck – Stuttgart Hauptbahnhof – Heslach Vogelrain) of the Stadtbahn, which is a part of the Verkehrs- und Tarifverbund Stuttgart. There are four stops on Remseck territory.

Bus
There are four bus lines (402, 403, 404, and 405) operating just in Remseck plus several lines connecting Remseck with Ludwigsburg, Waiblingen and other nearby cities. At weekends, the night-time bus N43 also stops in Remseck.

Media
Several media, including the Ludwigsburger Kreiszeitung and the Stuttgarter Zeitung, report on events in Remseck. The local weekly newspaper Remseck Woche is released every Thursday and the Pattonville Info every other week.

Culture and contemporary life

Museums
The “Radiomuseum” in Aldingen displays radios from 1924 to today. The “Heimatstube”, located in Nekarrems, presents peasant life in the region, including a shoemaker’s workshop. In the “Dorfschmiede” in Neckargröningen, visitors can try forging in the blacksmith’s shop.

Tourism
 Aldingen has a castle from the Renaissance (1580), which has an entrance in baroque style and a Gothic church (“Margaretenkirche”), built in 1398, which is still the Protestant church of Aldingen and has several gravestones from the 16th and 17th century.
 Hochberg also has a castle, built in 1593, with a great hall, a neo-Gothic, Protestant church (built in 1854) and a former wine press house (built in 1752), which is now a festival hall. There is also a Jewish cemetery from the 19th century.
 Hochdorf’s castle from the 16th century has been remodelled in 1612, but some parts of the walls are still there. Hochdorf also has a Gothic church named St. Wendelin and an ancient dairy-farm from the 16th century.
 Neckargröningen has several houses with a timber frame construction, an old town hall (built in 1592) and a former fortified church (St. Martin), which has a Gothic chancel originating in 1515 and wall paintings from the Late Middle Ages
 Neckarrems’ old town hall (built in 1564) features timber frame construction from 1915. The late Gothic church St. Michael and Sebastian was built around 1500, the “Castle Remseck” was built in 1842 on a mountain, where you can also find remains of a castle from the Middle Ages.
 Two bridges for pedestrians and cyclist were built in 1988 and 1990 and were the biggest self-supporting, wooden bridges in Europe at this time. The bridge over the Neckar is 80m long and the bridge over the Rems is 51,2m long.

Festivals and regular events
 Pentecost: Music festival at the Zipfelbach (Hochdorf)
 July: Wilhelmsfestplatz in Hochdorf (every other year); Summer festival with fireworks in Hochberg; Street fair in Neckarrems
 July/August: Soccer cup “Neckar-Rems Pokal”
 October: traditional “Oktoberfest“ in Hochberg
 December: Christmas market on a Sunday in Advent

Sport
Five of six boroughs have their own clubs: TV Aldingen, TSV Neckargröningen, VfB Neckarrems, SGV Hochdorf, and SKV Hochberg. The most successful football club is currently the VfB Neckarrems, playing in the Landesliga 1.

Demographics
As of December 31, 2008, the population of Remseck is 22,612, of which 11,086 are male and 11,526 are female. 2,676 resident aliens are living in Remseck. The population spreads out with 20.6% under the age of 18 and 15.9% older than 65 years.

Education
Remseck has one Gymnasium (Lise-Meitner-Gymnasium), located in Aldingen, one Realschule (Realschule Remseck), located in Pattonville and one Hauptschule (Wilhelm-Keil-Schule), located in Aldingen. Every borough has its own elementary school. There are also 15 kindergarten, including three Protestant, one Roman-Catholic and one ecumenical kindergarten.

International relations

Remseck is twinned with two cities.
  Meslay-du-Maine, France, since 1975
  Vigo di Fassa, Italy, since 1997

Notable people

 Friedrich Heim (1789–1850), born in Hochdorf, Protestant pastor and founder of the still existing Paulinepflege Winnenden
 Ludvig Holstein-Ledreborg (1839–1912), Danish politician, in 1909 Prime Minister
 Ulrich Kienzle (1936–2020), journalist and Middle East expert, an employee at the ZDF and 3sat, known by the ZDF political broadcast Frontal, born in Neckargröningen, grew up in Neckarrems
 Fabio Leutenecker (born 1990), football player
 David Yuengling (1808–1877), American brewer, the founder of America's oldest brewery, D. G. Yuengling & Son, born in Aldingen

References

Ludwigsburg (district)
Populated places on the Neckar basin
Populated riverside places in Germany
Württemberg